This is a list of candidates for the 1941 New South Wales state election. The election was held on 10 May 1941.

Retiring members

United Australia
 Bruce Walker (Hawkesbury)

Country
 Harry Carter (Liverpool Plains)
 Robert Hankinson (Murrumbidgee )
 Colin Sinclair (Namoi)

Legislative Assembly
Sitting members are shown in bold text. Successful candidates are highlighted in the relevant colour.

See also
 Members of the New South Wales Legislative Assembly, 1941–1944

References

1941